XHFN-TDT is a television station in Monterrey, Nuevo Leon, Mexico. The station carries the Azteca 7 network and also serves as the key station of the Azteca Noreste regional network, serving the northeastern states of Mexico with regional news and programming.

History
XHFN signed on in February 1974 on channel 8, under the auspices of CEMPAE (Centro para el Estudio de Medios y Procedimientos Avanzados de la Educación, or "Center for the Study of Advanced Media and Education Processes"). It primarily broadcast educational programs and telecourses.

CEMPAE was shuttered on January 20, 1983, with the Secretariat of Public Education absorbing its assets. Two months later, upon the creation of the Instituto Mexicano de la Televisión (abbreviated Imevisión), XHFN became part of the new federal agency. As an Imevisión station, XHFN broadcast programs from its two networks as well as local Monterrey productions, including local news.
In 1992, XHFN was part of the media package that became Televisión Azteca. Also in the 1990s, it moved from channel 8 to channel 7.

Digital television

Repeaters
XHWX-TDT is repeated on eight transmitters in Nuevo León:

|-

|-

|-

|-

|-

|-

|-

|}

References

Azteca 7 transmitters
Television stations in Monterrey